Sand diver may refer to:

Fish:
 Trichonotidae, a family of fishes of the suborder Trachinoidei
 long-finned sand diver, Limnichthys polyactis
 New Zealand sand diver, Tewara cranwellae
 Synodus intermedius (sand diver), a fish of the genus Synodus

Other uses:
, formerly Empire Farrier, an Empire F type coaster